Myself Ghaint is a 2014 Indian Feature film, Punjabi film directed by Akashdeep S Batth
and starring Gaurav Kakkar and Maninder Velly as leads, with Dolly Sidhu on Female Lead along with Aditi Govitrikar. The music of the film is by Mr. Vgrooves.

Cast
 Gaurav Kakkar as Ghaint
 Maninder Velly as Abs
 Dolly Sidhu as Simran
 Banny Chauhan as Lehri
 Aditi Govitrikar as Aditi
 Browney Prasher as Masarji

References

External links

2014 films
Punjabi-language Indian films
2010s Punjabi-language films